In December 1631, Mount Vesuvius in Italy erupted. The eruption began on 16 December 1631 and culminated the day after. The Volcanic Explosivity Index was VEI-5, and it was a Plinian eruption that buried many villages under the resulting lava flows. It is estimated that between 4,000 people were killed by the eruption, making it the highest death toll for a volcanic disaster in the Mediterranean in the last 1800 years. The 1631 eruption was considered to be of minor proportions regarding its eruptive magnitude and erupted volumes compared to the AD 79 eruption, but the damage was not. By the 1631 eruption, the summit of Mount Vesuvius had been reduced by 450m, making its total height lower than that of Mount Somma.

See also 
 Mount Vesuvius
 AD 79 eruption of Mount Vesuvius

References 

Mount Vesuvius
1631 in Italy
Volcanic eruptions in Italy
VEI-5 eruptions
Plinian eruptions
17th-century volcanic events